Cristián Roberto Arán Rubio (born 4 July 1971) is an Argentine football manager.

Coaching career
Born in Casilda, Arán began his career with hometown side CA Unión Casildense before joining Jorge Sampaoli's staff at local sides CA Alumni de Casilda, Argentino de Rosario and was later in charge of CA Belgrano de Arequito. In 2001, he also worked at Central Córdoba de Rosario.

Arán joined O'Higgins in 2007, after a recommendation from Sampaoli. In 2011, he took over the first team in the place of Ivo Basay as interim manager, and in December 2015, was definitely named manager of the main squad after replacing Pablo Sánchez.

Arán resigned from O'Higgins on 31 July 2017, and was appointed in charge of Rangers de Talca on 1 August 2018. He left the club on 12 May of the following year, and returned to his home country on 27 November to take over Belgrano de Arequito.

Arán started the 2021 season in charge of CA 9 de Julio de Arequito before returning to Chile on 1 September, after being named at the helm of Deportes Melipilla. In 2022, he managed Deportes Temuco in the Primera B de Chile.

References

External links
 

1971 births
Living people
People from Casilda
Sportspeople from Santa Fe Province
Argentine football managers
Primera B de Chile managers
Chilean Primera División managers
O'Higgins F.C. managers
Rangers de Talca managers
Deportes Melipilla managers
Deportes Temuco managers
Argentine expatriate football managers
Argentine expatriate sportspeople in Chile
Expatriate football managers in Chile